This national electoral calendar for 2011 lists the national/federal elections held in 2011 in all sovereign states and their dependent territories. By-elections are excluded, though national referendums are included.

January
9–15 January: South Sudan, Southern Sudanese independence referendum
23 January:
Central African Republic, President and Parliament (1st Round)
Portugal, President
31 January: Niger, Parliament and President (1st Round)

February
6 February: Cape Verde, Parliament
13 February:
Chad, Parliament
Switzerland, Referendum
18 February: Uganda, President and Parliament
22 February: Kosovo, President (1st Round) (indirect)
25 February: Ireland, Parliament

March
4 March: Samoa, Parliament
6 March: Estonia, Parliament
8 March: Federated States of Micronesia, Parliament
12 March: Niger, President (2nd Round)
13 March: Benin, President
19 March: Egypt, Constitutional referendum
20 March: Haiti, President (2nd Round)
27 March: Central African Republic, Parliament (2nd Round)

April
3 April:
Kazakhstan, President
Andorra, Parliament
7 April: Kosovo, President (2nd Round) (indirect)
8 April: Djibouti, President
9 April:
Nigeria, Parliament (1st round)
Iceland, Loan guarantees referendum
10 April: Peru, President (1st round) and Parliament
16 April: Nigeria, President
17 April: Finland, Parliament
25 April: Chad, President
26 April: Nigeria, Parliament (2nd round)
30 April:
Benin, Parliament
Laos, Parliament

May
2 May: Canada, Parliament
5 May: United Kingdom, Alternative Vote referendum
7 May:
Ecuador, Referendum
Niue, Parliament
Singapore, Parliament 
11 May: Micronesia, President (indirect)
19–21 May: Seychelles, President
22 May:
Cyprus, Parliament
Vietnam, Parliament
23 May: Netherlands, Senate (indirect)
28 May: Malta, Divorce referendum

June
2 June: Latvia, President (indirect)
5 June:
Macedonia, Parliament
Peru, President (2nd round)
Portugal, Parliament
Slovenia, Referendum
12 June: Turkey, Parliament
12–13 June: Italy, Referendum
15 June: Laos, President (indirect)
17–19 June: Liechtenstein, Registered partnership referendum
22 June: Palau, Casino referendum

July
1 July: Morocco, Constitutional referendum
3 July: Thailand, Parliament
17 July: São Tomé and Príncipe, President (1st round)
23 July: Latvia, Parliamentary dissolution referendum
25 July: Vietnam, President (indirect)

August
7 August:
Cape Verde, President (1st round)
São Tomé and Príncipe, President (2nd round)
21 August: Cape Verde, President (2nd round)
23 August: Liberia, Constitutional referendum
26 August: Abkhazia, President
27 August: Singapore, President 
29 August: Estonia, President (indirect)

September
11 September: Guatemala, President (1st round) and Parliament
15 September: Denmark, Parliament
17 September: Latvia, Parliament
18 September: Liechtenstein, Referendum on legalising abortion
20 September: Zambia, President and parliament
24 September: United Arab Emirates, Parliament
25 September: France, Senate
29 September: Isle of Man, Parliament
29 September–1 October: Seychelles, Parliament

October
9 October:
Poland, Parliament
Cameroon, President
Paraguay, Referendum
11 October: Liberia, President (1st round) and Parliament
15 October: Oman, Parliament
16 October: Bolivia, Judiciary
19 October: Jersey, Parliament
21/28 October: Kiribati, Parliament
21/24 October: United States, United Nations'Security Council
23 October:
Argentina, President and Legislative
Bulgaria, President (1st round)
Switzerland, Federal
Tunisia, Constituent Assembly
27 October: Ireland, President and constitutional referendums
29 October: Faroe Islands, Parliament
30 October:
Elections in Liechtenstein, National hospital referendum 
Bulgaria, President (2nd round)
Kyrgyzstan, President

November
3 November: Falkland Islands, electoral system referendum
6 November:
Guatemala, President (2nd round)
Nicaragua, President and Parliament
7 November: British Virgin Islands, House of Assembly
8 November: Liberia, President (2nd round)
13 November:
Equatorial Guinea, constitutional referendum
South Ossetia, President (1st round) and referendum
18 November–16 December: Moldova, President (indirect 1st round)
20 November: Spain, Parliament
21 November: Marshall Islands, Parliament
24 November: Gambia, President
25 November: Morocco, Parliament
26 November: New Zealand, General and Voting method referendum
27 November: South Ossetia, President (2nd round) 
28–29 November: Egypt, People's Assembly (1st phase 1st round)
28 November:
Democratic Republic of the Congo, President and Parliament
Guyana, Parliament
Saint Lucia, Parliament

December
4 December:
Croatia, Parliament
Slovenia, Parliament
Russia, Parliament
5–6 December: Egypt, People's Assembly (1st phase 2nd round)
8 December: Gibraltar, Parliament
11 December:
Côte d'Ivoire, Parliament
Transnistria, President (1st round)
12 December:
Pitcairn Islands, Islands Council
Tunisia, President (indirect)
14 December: Switzerland, Federal Council (indirect)
14–15 December: Egypt, People's Assembly (2nd phase 1st round)
17 December: Gabon, Parliament
21–22 December: Egypt, People's Assembly (2nd phase 2nd round)
25 December: Transnistria, President (2nd round)
29 December: Jamaica, Parliament

Indirect elections
4 February: Myanmar, President
22 February and 7 April: Kosovo, President
1 April: San Marino, Captains Regent
26–27 April: Ireland, Senate
11 May: Federated States of Micronesia, President
23 May: Netherlands, Senate
2 June: Latvia, President
15 June: Laos, President
22 July: India, Council of States
25 July: Vietnam, President
19 August: Kazakhstan, Senate
29 August: Estonia, President
25 September: 
France, Senate
Rwanda, Senate
1 October: San Marino, Captains Regent
9 October: Republic of the Congo, Senate
10 November: Nauru, President
15 November: Nauru, President (new election)
20 November: Spain, Senate
2 December: Moldova, President
14 December: Switzerland, Federal Council

References

National